St. George's Parish was created as a civil parish in Kings County, Prince Edward Island, Canada, during the 1764–1766 survey of Samuel Holland.

It contains the following townships:

 Lot 51
 Lot 52
 Lot 53
 Lot 54
 Lot 55
 Lot 56
 Lot 66

It also contains Kings Royalty.

Parishes of Prince Edward Island
Geography of Kings County, Prince Edward Island